The Big 12 Conference Softball Freshman of the Year is a college softball award given to the Big 12 Conference's most outstanding freshman player. The award has been given annually since 1996.

Key

Winners

Winners by school

References

Awards established in 1996
Freshman
NCAA Division I softball conference freshmen of the year